The 1991 Hungarian Grand Prix was a Formula One motor race held at Hungaroring on 11 August 1991. It was the tenth race of the 1991 Formula One World Championship. The 77-lap race was won from pole position by Ayrton Senna, driving a McLaren-Honda, with the Williams-Renaults of Nigel Mansell and Riccardo Patrese second and third respectively.

Qualifying

Pre-qualifying report
In the Friday morning pre-qualifying session, a Brabham topped the time sheets for the second Grand Prix in succession. However, this time it was Mark Blundell who was fastest, over 1.4 seconds faster than his team-mate Martin Brundle in second. Third was Olivier Grouillard for Fondmetal, the third time the Frenchman had pre-qualified this season. The fourth pre-qualifier was Michele Alboreto in the Footwork.

The four entrants who failed to pre-qualify were, unusually, within two seconds of the slowest pre-qualifier. Fifth was Gabriele Tarquini in the AGS, less than two tenths of a second slower than Alboreto. Alex Caffi was sixth in the other Footwork, 1.4 seconds behind Tarquini. Just a tenth further back was the other AGS of Fabrizio Barbazza, who was only two tenths faster than the Coloni of Pedro Chaves. It was the Portuguese driver's tenth failure to pre-qualify from ten attempts this season.

Pre-qualifying classification

Qualifying report
Nigel Mansell and Williams were on a roll as Formula One arrived in Hungary, while Ayrton Senna and Alain Prost were ordered by FISA to work out their differences following their confrontation in the German Grand Prix. Senna was also angry with his McLaren team after he had run out of fuel in the two previous races, losing valuable points to Mansell. During the practice session, McLaren made the first test for the semi-automatic gearbox on their car. Senna proceeded to dominate qualifying, taking pole by over a second from Riccardo Patrese, Mansell, Prost, Gerhard Berger, Jean Alesi, Emanuele Pirro, Stefano Modena, Ivan Capelli, and Martin Brundle.

Qualifying classification

Race

Race report
At the start, Senna and Patrese both got away well, but Senna managed to keep the lead, with Mansell, Prost, Berger, and Alesi rounding out the top six. Mansell followed and hounded his teammate, but Senna was unable to pull out a significant gap. Meanwhile, Prost's day ended early with an engine failure, just adding to the misery that was the 1991 season for the three-time champion.  Mansell eventually got past Patrese and set off after Senna, but on a track that is not conducive to passing, he had to settle for second. Senna duly won from Mansell, Patrese, Berger, Alesi, and Capelli. Senna now led the world championship by 12 points as the teams packed up and headed to Belgium. Senna dedicated this victory to the late Soichiro Honda, founder of Honda, who died days before the Grand Prix weekend.

Race classification

Championship standings after the race

Drivers' Championship standings

Constructors' Championship standings

References

Hungarian Grand Prix
Hungarian Grand Prix
Grand Prix
Hungarian Grand Prix